Mary Agard Pocock (31 December 1886 – 10 July 1977) was a South African phycologist.

Biography
Born in Rondebosch in 1886 to William Pocock and Elizabeth Dacomb, Mary Pocock attended Bedford High School and Cheltenham Ladies' College. Pocock then attended the University of London where she studied botany, receiving her degree in 1908. Following her degree Pocock taught at girls schools in London and the Cape before continuing her study in 1919; completing an additional honors degree in botany at Cambridge. She was a lecturer at Rhodes University for a year in 1924, a position which she took up occasionally again during her career. In 1925 she travelled with Dorothea Bleek from Rhodesia to Luanda collecting flowering plants which she studied at the Royal Botanical Gardens, Kew and the British Museum upon her return. Travelling back to South Africa, Pocock became interested in algae, obtaining a PhD on the subject from the University of Cape Town at the age of 46. In 1942 she established Rhodes University's herbarium (RUH). She studied Volvox in particular. Pocock in collaboration with Marion S. Cave became the first group to identify how many chromosomes algae have.

An author of over 30 publications on algae, a number of plants are also named after Pocock. She received the Linnean Society's Crisp Medal, and was a fellow of the Linnean Society and the Royal Society of South Africa.

References

External links

1886 births
1977 deaths
20th-century women scientists
Alumni of the University of London
Alumni of University of London Worldwide
Fellows of the Linnean Society of London
Fellows of the Royal Society of South Africa
People educated at Bedford High School, Bedfordshire
People educated at Cheltenham Ladies' College
People from Makhanda, Eastern Cape
People from Rondebosch
Phycologists
Academic staff of Rhodes University
South African women academics
University of Cape Town alumni
Women phycologists